Archibald Cary Coolidge (March 6, 1866 – January 14, 1928) was an American educator and diplomat.  He was a professor of history at Harvard College from 1908 and the first director of the Harvard University Library from 1910 until his death. Coolidge was also a scholar in international affairs, a planner of the Widener Library, a member of the United States Foreign Service, and editor-in-chief of the policy journal Foreign Affairs.

Early life 

Archibald Coolidge was born in Boston, Massachusetts as the third of five boys.  His parents were Harvard University Law School graduate Joseph Randolph Coolidge and Julia (née Gardner) Coolidge, both from prominent and wealthy Boston Brahmin families.  His siblings included U.S. Minister to Nicaragua John Gardner Coolidge, noted lawyer Harold Jefferson Coolidge Sr. (the father of zoologist Harold Jefferson Coolidge Jr.), architect J. Randolph Coolidge Jr. and mathematician and fellow Harvard professor Julian Lowell Coolidge.

His paternal uncle was Thomas Jefferson Coolidge, the Boston businessman and U.S. Minister to France.  His father, Joseph Randolph Coolidge, was a great-grandson of the 3rd United States President Thomas Jefferson, through his maternal great-grandparents, Thomas Mann Randolph Jr. and Martha Jefferson Randolph.  Archibald's great-uncles were Thomas Jefferson Randolph, George Wythe Randolph, and his grandfather, Joseph Coolidge, was a distant relative of President Calvin Coolidge.

Through his mother, Archibald was the nephew of John Lowell Gardner II.  His mother and uncle John were the grandchildren of merchant Joseph Peabody, one of the wealthiest men in the United States at the time of his death in 1844.

Coolidge attended seven different elementary and preparatory schools, the Adams Academy in Quincy, and Harvard College, where he became associated with the Owl Club and graduated summa cum laude in history in 1887.  He also attended the University of Berlin and the École des Sciences Politiques in Paris.  He earned a Ph.D. from the University of Freiburg in Germany 1892.

Career
From 1893 on, he taught various history courses at Harvard, first as an instructor, from 1899 on as assistant professor, and in 1908, he was made a full professor of history.

Coolidge today is recognized as having turned the Harvard College Library into a major research institution. Coolidge helped make the Harvard Library "one of the best organized libraries for scholars and students as well as one of the great libraries of the world." He is further credited with bringing the study of history of Latin America, the Far East, and the Slavic countries to the history department of Harvard. In 1908, he was appointed to the Harvard Library Council and was chairman of this council in 1909. In 1910, he became the first director of the Harvard University Library. Coolidge's tenure saw the building of the Widener Library. To detail his efforts in making the Harvard Library a centerpiece for students at the university, "The first to hold this office, Professor Coolidge gave a creative interpretation to its functions and made it an essential part of University organization. He kept before the University and its friends a broad and comprehensive idea  of the Library and its possibilities, and had the satisfaction of seeing the Harvard Library under his administration reach an assured position among the great libraries of the world. This result was due in large to his own wisdom, vision, patient skill, and interest in every side of the Library's welfare. He encouraged equally the acquisition of unique special collections, the prompt and steady purchase of books asked for, and improved facilities for work by members of the University and by visiting scholars." His own department described his personal characteristics: "He gave himself to history; and it was characteristic of him that his gifts to the Department in his lifetime should take permanent form in his bequests... One prejudice he did not rise above- a prejudice for intellectual distinction; but to him this was a thing of many kinds... His attachments were of the heart. He was a man of strong feeling, quick to anger at injustice, profoundly stirred by sympathy. He hated the waste of useless friction and mis-directed strength... His mind was essentially political: he knew that he lived in a world of men, not of ideas." Coolidge's time at Harvard shows his true dedication to Academia, with his emphasized focus on history and the improvement of the Harvard Library. He was an essential member of the Harvard Faculty and made improvements to the college that would prove to be long-lasting.

Diplomatic career

Between college terms and parallel to his post at Harvard, Coolidge also pursued a career in diplomacy, which fit his travel interests and his desire and aptitude for learning languages well.  He held posts as secretary to the American legation in Saint Petersburg, Russia (1890–1891), as private secretary to the American minister in France (1892), and as secretary to the American legation in Vienna (1893).

At the end of World War I, more important assignments followed. Coolidge joined the Inquiry study group established by Woodrow Wilson. The U.S. State Department sent him in 1918 to Russia to report on the situation there. In 1919, he was made the head of the so-called Coolidge Mission, which was "appointed by the American Delegation on 27 December and set up headquarters in Vienna.". Secretary of State Robert Lansing informed Coolidge in a telegram dated December 26, 1918, that "You are hereby assigned to the American Commission to observe political conditions in Austria-Hungary and neighboring countries.". Coolidge and his group in Vienna analyzed the state of affairs on Central Europe and the Balkans and made recommendations for the benefit of the U.S. participants at the Paris Peace Conference, 1919.

In 1921, Coolidge worked as a negotiator for the American Relief Administration and helped organize the humanitarian aid to Russia after the famine of 1921. Coolidge also was one of the founders of the Council on Foreign Relations, which grew out of the Inquiry study group, and served as the first editor of its publication Foreign Affairs from 1922 until his death in 1928.

Coolidge was also a member of the Monticello Association, which was created in 1913 to care for and preserve President Jefferson's home, Monticello, serving as its president from 1919 to 1925.

Death
Coolidge died at his home in Boston, Massachusetts on January 14, 1928.

Publications
The United States as a World Power (1908)

The United States as a World Power was originally published in 1908 and is based on a number of lectures that Coolidge delivered from 1906 to 1907 in Sorbonne.  These lectures have been re-published numerous times in the creation of this book. Throughout Coolidge's upbringing and development as a scholar, his most heavily studied area was in the field of foreign relations. This can be seen through his time spent as editor of "'Foreign Affairs'' as well as the majority of his publications involving foreign relations. In this book, Coolidge chronicles America's formation as a nation leading up to its increased involvement in foreign affairs in the 20th century. The book showcases Coolidge's interpretations of the status of global affairs at the beginning of the 20th century with a focus on the United States. It represents an early 20th century scholar's mindset. While Coolidge is quick to move past some of America's obvious flaws of the time at moments, he delivers a clear, concise chronicle. The book is dense in its discussion of the overall growth of the United States, as Coolidge attempts to create a full narrative. Overall, this books shows that American scholars at the beginning of the 20th century were thinking critically about the United States’ positioning in the world.

1) Introduction:

In the Introduction, Coolidge outlines the status of global politics at the beginning of the 20th century. He quickly states, “The idea that one people should control the known world is ancient enough, its most salient expression being found in imperial Rome and equally imperial China; and it is not extinct even now." The tendency of states holding a considerably larger amount of power compared to others is a consistent trend throughout global history. Coolidge ranks the five great powers of the world in order: 1) Great Britain 2) Russia 3) France 4) United States 5) Germany. (9–12) Criteria included in these rankings are: size of landholdings, amount of resources, and birth rates. He includes these rankings to put the U.S's placing in the global scale of power in perspective. In conclusion, Coolidge asserts that the United States will have a huge role to play in the upcoming century and that this can either be for the benefit or detriment of the world.(15)

2) Formation and Growth:

In this chapter, Coolidge outlines America's growth as a state from its founding. He describes the unique geography of the United States in order to differentiate the nation from other world powers. The U.S, located in the middle of the Western Hemisphere in a “wholly temperate zone”(19), is homogenous in its geographic makeup. There are no serious natural obstacles that block Americans from one another; other global examples include the Andes in South America, the Himalayas in Asia, and the Sahara in Africa. Coolidge then outlines America's growth as a state, originally starting as a number of colonies and later transitioning to own all land from the Atlantic to the Pacific. (22–36). This growth was initially threatened with the Civil War, in which North–South divisions reached an all-time low; however, Coolidge believed the abolition of slavery would eliminate the possibility of another conflict. (37) In slowly expanding throughout its history, from the Louisiana Purchase to the Gasden Purchase to the Alaska Purchase, the United States embarks upon a new wave of expansion in the years following the Civil War. This wave is spiked by the U.S's involvement in the Spanish-American War.

3) Nationality and Immigration

Coolidge takes time to comment on the evolving makeup of the American population in this chapter. While immigration to the United States greatly increased throughout the 19th century, bringing in peoples from all over Europe and even Asia, Coolidge states, “the United States of the future bids fair to be an English-speaking community, of mixed origin, but fused by common traditions, interests, aspirations, and language into one essentially homogenous people.”(Coolidge 60) The downfall to this creation of a homogenous community is that a major group is left out of this, colored people in America. Coolidge spends more time discussing this issue in the next chapter.

4) Race Questions

Coolidge acknowledges that at the time of his writing there existed one of the most complicated issues within the United States, the problem of race relations. He acknowledges the existence of a white superiority complex, predominantly among the English-speaking peoples of the world. (64) These people are selective in which races they choose to welcome into their portion of society, as race-mixing is not socially acceptable. (65) Further, America's treatment of the Native-American and African-American populations are a seriously troubling chapter in American history, according to Coolidge. In time-old fashion, Coolidge refers to Native Americans as the “red man” (68) and details their subjugation as “one of the many unsatisfactory chapters in the history of dealings between the stronger and weaker races of the world; but this chapter is neither so disgraceful nor so important as has been made out.”(68) He is quick to glance over this part of American history. With African-Americans, Coolidge foresees increased problems between white and black Americans, particularly in the South, most likely leading to further segregation. Coolidge's worries of the future race relations in the South later turn out to be true during the Jim Crow Era. Another issue of race involved the increased immigration of Japanese and Chinese immigrants, mainly moving to the West Coast. The presence of Asian migrants in America was met with great hostility; examples of anti-Asian sentiments include the passing of the Chinese Exclusion Act of 1882 that attempted to stop Chinese further immigration. Coolidge examines the issue of Asian immigration not through a humanitarian lens but through the potential threat of retaliation from China and Japan. (78) He worries that both Japan and China would threaten the United States if its people were being persecuted. Altogether, Coolidge is neutral in his dealing of race relations within America. He notes the grave threat that poor race relations will bring to America but does not look to their causes in order to determine a solution.

5) Ideals and Shibboleths

In this chapter Coolidge brings up a contradiction within the American conscious in the thirty-year period before the Spanish-American War. In this time frame, Americans were able to create a national ideal: “They believed their country to be the best, the freest, the richest, the happiest, in the world, and they gave due recognition to their own merits which had made it so.”(82) At the same time there existed so many internal struggles that challenged this ideal: race relations, political corruption, a growing wage gap, the Depression of 1893. However, Coolidge finds that what kept the American psyche afloat was a firm belief in the nation's founding principles of liberty and equality.(91) This can be proved through American support for independence movements throughout the world and foreign policy based on cultivating mutually benefitting relationships with other nations. (93)

6) Monroe Doctrine

The Monroe Doctrine attempted to differentiate the United States with the older powers in Europe. (Monroe Doctrine) The U.S formally opposed colonialism in the Americas while also promising to not interfere in the European colonies. Coolidge writes on three core characteristics of the Doctrine that were commonly misunderstood: 1) it was not an act of disrespect 2) it was not a part of international law 3) it was a doctrine of self-defense. (107) He finds that the basis of the Doctrine was crafted in order to distinguish between the New World and the Old World. (118) As discussed earlier, the history of the 19th century in the United States involves little to no dealings in foreign affairs. However, Coolidge asserts that the increased conflicts within European landholdings placed the U.S in a difficult position. He is afraid of America entering a role of an "international policeman", as that title brings countless responsibilities and potential conflicts with nations across the world. He asks, "if the United States is going to abandon that portion of the Monroe Doctrine which forbids interference in European affairs, how can it insist that Europe shall not meddle in those of America?" (120) Contrary to his fears of increased international activity, the United States eventually abandon the principles of the Monroe Doctrine.

7) The Spanish War

To Coolidge, the Spanish-American War marks "the beginning of an epoch"(121). Breaking away from the Monroe Doctrine, the United States fully enter into global politics in engaging in military conflict with Spain. While the most notable causes for war include the sinking of the USS Maine and sensationalist news stories about the Cuban Revolution from Joseph Pulitzer's New York World and William Randolph Hearst's New York Journal, Coolidge finds a number of further reasons for the war with Spain. These include already poor relations between the countries and an American desire of spreading its influence in Spanish territories.(122–123) The war itself to Coolidge is not worth discussing in much detail, "The war was a short bloodless one between two nations of very unequal resources. There were but three battles worthy of the name, -two on water and one on the land."(122) In this, he references the Battles at Manila Bay, El-Caney, and San Juan Hill. While he does praise the efforts of the American military, he notes that Spain's decreasing relevancy as a world power is a core reason for the American victory. Other historians even claim that U.S troops were ill-equipped, unprepared, and lacking in size. The war, although short in actual time spent fighting, brought about sweeping changes for both Cuba and the United States. These include greater American influence through naval access to the Pacific, Atlantic and Caribbean oceans, the liberation of Cuba, and an increased global reputation for America. Coolidge comments on this reputation,"The fame of the country's wealth and prosperity, of the ingenuity and practical abilities of its inhabitants, and especially of their eagerness to make money, was wide-spread."(131)

8) The Acquisition of Colonies

In this chapter Coolidge goes into the debates that occurred after the Spanish-American War involving America's role in the Spanish territories in Cuba, the Philippines, Puerto Rico, and Hawaii. There was growing anti-colonial sentiment in some sections of the United States, most notably lead by the Anti-Imperialist League.  Anti-Imperialists, like Mark Twain, viewed America's efforts in expanding its global influence as contradictory to the United States' founding principles Coolidge, while not being as staunchly pro-imperialist as jingoes like Henry Cabot Lodge, states that the acquisition of colonies is simply an outcome of America's evolution. He even argues that the U.S, throughout its history, has "held lands which were virtually colonies,whose inhabitants did not enjoy the rights of self-government." (137) He supports American growth and expansion, however he does acknowledge the struggles of colonization. While the territories America gained after the Spanish–American War were not as large as the landholdings of the British Empire, Coolidge fears the assimilation of American values with native peoples who speak different languages. (139)

9) The Philippine Problem

Directly after the Spanish-American War, the American military began a long armed-conflict against Filipino revolutionaries. Revolutionaries The conflict resulted in 4,300 Americans killed compared to 20,000 Filipino soldiers killed and a staggering number of around 200,000 civilians killed. In this chapter, Coolidge details the process of acquiring and the debates surrounding this acquisition. After defeating the Spanish forces in Manila, the U.S had three options in regards to the Philippines: 1) leave 2) give the islands to the insurgents 3) take the Philippines.(151) The U.S chose the third option, signing the Treaty of Paris in 1899. Throughout the American-Philippine War, a nationwide discussion revolved around the principality of the war. The Anti-Imperialists denounced American intervention in the islands. An example of their protests can be found in Mark Twain's essay, To the Person Sitting in Darkness. At the same time, expansionists viewed the bloodshed as a necessary byproduct of American growth. Coolidge finds flaws in both of these groups. For the Anti-Imperialists, he claims their desire to completely leave the Philippines and allow the inhabitants to govern themselves is impractical. (159) For the expansionists, Coolidge denounces expansionist claims that the United States will be able to establish a solid government because "The Filipinos belong to a race which has never shown any capacity for independent civilization, and which cannot reasonably be expected to do so at any time that can now be foreseen".(160) Coolidge's diminishes the Filipino people, but he does state that the Americans are the root problem in the handling of the Philippines.(169) He criticizes the U.S's inability to keep order and peace in the islands, the heavy taxation that the war caused, and the lack of communication between the Americans and Filipinos. (169) However, his overall conclusion is that the U.S "have accomplished a great deal in their task of transforming the islands. Improved means of communication, public works of all kinds, modern sanitation, justice, public security, works of all kinds, modern sanitation, justice, public security, honest and efficient government, popular participation in the government"(170). While Coolidge treats both expansionists and Anti-Imperialists equally in his criticisms, he overall leans toward the expansionists.

The last 10 chapters of the book delve into the economic considerations in America's growth and the relationships between the United States and France, Germany, Russia, England, Canada, Latin America, the Pacific, China, and Japan. Coolidge goes into the historical associations that the United States has with each of these nations or regions. It is a further examination of the United States' placement in the world's global politics.

The Origins of the Triple Alliance (1917)
Ten Years of War and Peace (1927)
 Editor-in-Chief, Foreign Affairs, a journal of the Council on Foreign Relations.

References

External links

1866 births
1928 deaths
American diplomats
American historians
Coolidge family
Harvard College faculty
Harvard College alumni
University of Freiburg alumni